Three polls make up the 2020 NCAA Division I women's soccer rankings, the United Soccer Coaches Poll, the Soccer America Poll, and the Top Drawer Soccer Poll. They represent the ranking system for the 2020 NCAA Division I women's soccer season. However, due to the COVID-19 pandemic, only the United Soccer Coaches poll was released for the fall season. No preseason poll was released and a fifteen-team poll was released on September 22, 2020 as the first poll of the season.

Top Drawer Soccer released a national ranking on February 1 for the Spring Season.  The ranking took into account records of teams that played in the fall.

Legend

Fall 2020

United Soccer Coaches 

Source:

Spring 2021

United Soccer Coaches 
Source:

Top Drawer Soccer 

Source:

References 

College women's soccer rankings in the United States